The Illinois Public Pension Amendment was a proposed amendment to the Illinois state constitution. On November 6, 2012, Illinois voters rejected it in a statewide referendum.

A legislatively referred constitutional amendment, if approved, it would have amended the Constitution of Illinois. The measure would have made it so that a three-fifths approval would be required by the General Assembly, city councils, and school districts that wish to increase the pension benefits of their employees.

Passage in the state legislature
In the legislature, the bill that referred the amendment to voters was entitled "HJRCA 49 (2012)" and was sponsored by Michael Madigan. It was required that, in order to qualify for the ballot, the measure be approved by 60% approval of both the Illinois House of Representatives and the Illinois Senate. On April 18, 2012, it passed the House unanimously, 113–0. On May 3, 2012 the bill passed the Senate, 51–2.

Referendum
The amendment was referred to the voters in a referendum during the general election of 2012 Illinois elections on November 6, 2012.

Ballot language
The ballot text read,

Endorsements

Results
In order to be approved, the measure required either 60% support among those specifically voting on the amendment or 50% support among all ballots cast in the elections. The measure failed to achieve either.

References

2012 Illinois elections
Public Pension Amendment
2012 ballot measures
Public pension funds in the United States